Michel Pajon (born 30 June 1949) is a member of the National Assembly of France.  He represents the Seine-Saint-Denis department,  and is a member of the Socialiste, radical, citoyen et divers gauche.

References

1949 births
Living people
Socialist Party (France) politicians
Deputies of the 12th National Assembly of the French Fifth Republic
Deputies of the 13th National Assembly of the French Fifth Republic
Deputies of the 14th National Assembly of the French Fifth Republic